Juan Esteban Montero Rodríguez (February 12, 1879 – February 25, 1948) was a Chilean political figure. He served twice as president of Chile between 1931 and 1932.

Early life
He was born in Santiago, the son of Benjamín Montero and of Eugenia Rodríguez. Juan Esteban Montero studied at the colegio de San Ignacio and at the Universidad de Chile. He graduated as a lawyer on September 16, 1901, and soon after became professor of civil and Roman law at his alma mater. He also worked as a government lawyer and in private practice. He married Graciela Fehrman Martínez, with whom he had four children: Juan Esteban, Pedro, Benjamín and Carmen.

Presidency

Montero's first incursion in politics was in 1931, when President Carlos Ibáñez del Campo named him Minister of the Interior and Social Welfare. After the resignation of president Ibáñez on July 26, 1931 he reluctantly agreed to serve in similar position to Ibáñez's successor, Pedro Opazo; just to find himself promoted to president the very next day, after Opazo's resignation. Montero, as a way out of the political impasse, immediately called for presidential elections. In the meanwhile he assumed as vice president.

Very soon after, Montero accepted the presidential nomination of the Radical Party, and in order to qualify, he resigned his vicepresidency on August 20, 1931. The position was assumed by Manuel Trucco. The Trucco administration was only supposed to be a caretaker one, keeping order in the country until the presidential elections. Nonetheless it was faced with very difficult moments such as the Sailors' mutiny in the navy, caused by the reduction of the salaries of the enlisted men (September 1–5, 1931), which was controlled only after an aerial bombing of the fleet and presaged difficult times ahead.

Supported by the Liberals and Conservatives as well as the Radicals, Juan Esteban Montero was the clear winner of the presidential elections, obtaining almost 64% of the popular vote, defeating leftist José Santos Salas, a protégé of former President Carlos Ibáñez. He took over on November 15, in the midst of a political and economic chaos that resulted from the market crash of 1929. His program called for the implementation of an austerity program that involved the reduction of public expenditures and public salaries, a downsizing of the public administration and an increase of the foreign debt. Notwithstanding these harsh measures, the depreciation of the currency continued, and inflation soared while the Central Bank reserves were at an all-time low. This economic program only managed to cause widespread discontent, while in no way improving the economy, and in turn led to his downfall.

On June 4, 1932, colonel Marmaduke Grove staged a coup d'état by taking over the Air Force base of El Bosque, in Santiago, and demanding the resignation of President Montero. Montero refused to call on the army to put down the coup, and instead chose to resign. That same night, the victorious revolutionaries organized a Government Junta composed of retired General Arturo Puga, Eugenio Matte and Carlos Dávila, with colonel Grove as their minister of Defense. After this episode, Montero retired completely from politics, and went back to private practice and business. He died in Santiago, on February 25, 1948, at the age of 69.

See also
History of Chile
Norte Grande insurrection
Government Junta of Chile (1932)
Socialist Republic of Chile
List of Chilean coups d'état

External links
Complete biography  
Biography  
Short biography 

1879 births
1948 deaths
Presidents of Chile
Chilean Ministers of the Interior
Chilean Ministers of Health
Heads of state of Chile
People from Santiago
Radical Party of Chile politicians
Candidates for President of Chile
Chilean people of Spanish descent